Tyrer is a surname. Notable people with the surname include:

Alan Tyrer (1942–2008), English professional footballer
Anderson Tyrer (1893–1962), English concert pianist and orchestra conductor
Arthur Tyrer (born 1931), English former footballer
Christian Tyrer (born 1973), English former rugby league and rugby union footballer
Edward Tyrer (1917-2004), a senior British colonial police officer and Commissioner of Police, Hong Kong
Hayyim Tyrer (died 1813), rabbi
Jim Tyrer (1939-1980), American football player
Steve Tyrer (born 1989), English rugby league player